Li Baohua (October 2, 1909 – February 19, 2005) was a People's Republic of China politician. He was born in Laoting County, Hebei Province. He was the oldest child of Li Dazhao (1889-1927) who was the co-founder of the Chinese Communist Party (CCP). After the death of Li Dazhao, the communists managed to send Li Baohua to Japan to receive his college education. Upon his return to China, Li Baohua participated in the communist-led revolution for years. After the establishment of the People's Republic of China, he first served as a vice minister in the Department of Water Resources and Electric Power. He was the secretary of the CCP Provincial Committee Secretary in Anhui from 1962 to 1971. He was the governor of the People's Bank of China from 1978 to 1982. He was the chairman of the CPPCC of Guizhou Province from 1977 to 1979.

1909 births
2005 deaths
People's Republic of China politicians from Hebei
Chinese Communist Party politicians from Hebei
Political office-holders in Anhui
Governors of the People's Bank of China
CPPCC Chairmen of Guizhou
CPPCC Chairmen of Anhui